Psammaletes is a genus of sand wasps in the family Crabronidae. There are about nine described species in Psammaletes.

Species
These nine species belong to the genus Psammaletes:
 Psammaletes arizonicus R. Bohart, 2000
 Psammaletes bigeloviae (Cockerell, 1897)
 Psammaletes brasilae R. Bohart, 2000
 Psammaletes costaricae R. Bohart, 2000
 Psammaletes crucis (Cockerell, 1897)
 Psammaletes floridicus R. Bohart, 2000
 Psammaletes hooki R. Bohart, 2000
 Psammaletes mexicanus (Cameron, 1890)
 Psammaletes schlingeri R. Bohart, 2000

References

External links

 

Crabronidae
Articles created by Qbugbot